Der Frosch mit der Maske (translation: The Frog with the Mask), aka Face of the Frog, is a 1959 West German-Danish black-and-white crime film directed by Harald Reinl and starring Siegfried Lowitz and Joachim Fuchsberger. It was the first of a very successful series of films based on works by Edgar Wallace produced by Rialto Film in West Germany. This film was adapted from the 1925 novel The Fellowship of the Frog.

Plot

Cast

Production
The film is adapted from Edgar Wallace's novel The Fellowship of the Frog (1925). Previous versions were made in 1928 in the US (as a serial) and in 1937 in the UK, both titled The Mark of the Frog.

The project was deemed risky, as so far no German crime film had really succeeded at the box office after World War II. Philipsen acquired the rights for the movie adaption of The Fellowship of the Frog and The Crimson Circle from Penelope Wallace, with an option on other novels by her father should the films be successful. Barthel decided on Reinl as director and fixed production cost at a maximum of 600,000 Deutsche Mark. As scriptwriter the producer hired Egon Eis who had worked on the 1931 adaption of The Squeaker. Eis' script for the Frog, delivered in January 1959 under the pen name "Trygve Larsen", stuck closely to the novel. Jochen Joachim Bartsch, a friend of Reinl, also worked on the script. The "comic relief" character, played by Arent, was added by the script writers, he does not exist in the novel. Some characters were much reduced in significance (Broad and Maitland), some were dropped altogether (Maitland's sister). Another change was making Fuchsberger's character the nephew of Sir Archibald, the head of Scotland Yard. In addition, the name for Brockmann's character was changed: in Wallace's novel he was called "Harry Lime" (or Lyme). Since this had been the name of Orson Welles' character in Carol Reed's The Third Man (1949), the producers decided to change it, to Philo Johnson.

Cinematography took place from 24 April to 9 June 1959. The studio for interiors was Palladium Atelier at Kopenhagen. Exteriors were also shot in and around Kopenhagen. A small team, including Reinl and his director of cinematography Kalinke travelled to London for two days to shoot some stock footage to be used in back projection.

Release
The FSK gave the film a rating of 16 years and up, unsuitable for screening on public holidays. Four scenes had to be cut to receive even this rating and avoid an "adults only" one.

The film premiered on 4 September 1959 at the Universum in Stuttgart. With an audience of 3 million in Germany the film was an extraordinary success.

The film's box office success ultimately spawned the Edgar Wallace series of films by Rialto of 32 films that ran through 1972. The series heavily influenced the style and content of German crime and mystery films throughout the 1960s, as well as giving rise to outright copycat films made by other studios such as Artur Brauner's CCC Film.

Home Media
The film made its DVD debut on 29 January 2008 by Infinity Entertainment Group as a part of The Edgar Wallace Collection which included several other adaptions of the works of writer Edgar Wallace.

References

External links
 
 

1959 films
1950s mystery thriller films
German mystery thriller films
West German films
1950s German-language films
Films directed by Harald Reinl
Films based on British novels
Films based on works by Edgar Wallace
Films set in England
Films shot in Denmark
Danish black-and-white films
German black-and-white films
Remakes of American films
Remakes of British films
Constantin Film films
Danish thriller films
1950s German films